Mohd Asrol bin Ibrahim (born 13 December 1986) is a Malaysian footballer who plays for  Harini 
 F.C. in the Malaysia M3 League as a midfielder.

References

External links 
 

Living people
Malaysian footballers
Association football defenders
1986 births
Terengganu FC players
Terengganu F.C. II players
Felcra FC players